This is an article about the baseball player.  For the college football coach, see Red Roberts (American football).

Charles Emory "Red" Roberts (August 8, 1918 – December 2, 1998) was a Major League Baseball player. He batted and threw right-handed.

He was born in Carrollton, Georgia and died in Atlanta.

External links

1918 births
1998 deaths
Washington Senators (1901–1960) players
Baseball players from Georgia (U.S. state)
Major League Baseball shortstops
Minor league baseball managers
Sanford Seminoles players
Charlotte Hornets (baseball) players
Chattanooga Lookouts players
Montgomery Rebels players
Carrollton Hornets players
Charleston Rebels players
Alexander City Millers players
People from Carrollton, Georgia
Sportspeople from the Atlanta metropolitan area